The 2003 Scottish local elections were held on 1 May 2003, the same day as Scottish Parliament elections and local elections in parts of England. All 32 Scottish councils had all their seats up for election – all Scottish councils are unitary authorities.

This was the last election for local government in Scotland to use the first past the post electoral system.

Boundary changes
Minor council boundary took place to better reflect certain areas:

 Transfer of properties at Blackburn from Aberdeen City Council to Aberdeenshire Council
 Transfer of an area of land at West Farm, Broxburn from City of Edinburgh Council to West Lothian Council
 Transfer of an area of land and properties at Ardoch Sewage Works from Argyll & Bute Council to West Dunbartonshire Council
 Transfer of an area of land at Braehead from Glasgow City Council to Renfrewshire Council

Results

|-
!colspan=2|Parties
!Votes
!Votes %
!+/-
!Wards
!NetGain/Loss
|-
| 
|611,843||32.6||−3.7%||509||−42
|-
| 
|451,660||24.1||−4.6%||181||−23
|-
| 
|282,895||15.1||+1.6%||122||+14
|-
| 
|272,057||14.5||+1.9%||175||+18
|-
| 
|189,749||10.1||+3.0%||230||+39
|-
| style="width: 10px" style="background-color:" |
| style="text-align: left;" scope="row" | Other
|67,533||3.6||+2.0%||4||−6
|-
!colspan=2|Total!!1,875,737!! !! !! 1,222!!
|}

Councils

Notes and references

 
2003
Local elections|Local elections
May 2003 events in the United Kingdom